Dennis Mallonee (born January 22, 1955) is an American writer of comic books.

Career
Dennis Mallonee entered the comics profession by suggesting story ideas to writer Bill Mantlo. Mallonee and artist Rick Hoberg developed the format for Marvel's Official Handbook of the Marvel Universe series. At a 1985 San Diego Comic-Con International panel featuring Champions RPG creators Steve Peterson, George MacDonald, and Ray Greer, an audience member asked when the Champions characters were going to be adapted into comic book form. The RPG creators had no plans for such a translation at the time. However, Dennis Mallonee, who was already writing several Champions supplements, was in the audience and spoke up that he would be willing to write a Champions comic. Following the panel, Mallonnee, Peterson, and MacDonald discussed terms for the series; among the key points were that all the characters would remain fully creator-owned, and that Mallonee would have creative control of the comic book.

In the mid-1980s comic creator Dennis Mallonee approached Hero Games to license comic book rights to the Champions heroes. Hero Games was actually a licensee themselves, with the characters largely owned by their original players, but they were able to work with the actual creators to get Malonee the permissions he needed; the result was an Eclipse comic book called Champions (1986-1987). After the success of the Eclipse series, Mallonee decided to publish additional Champions comics under his own imprint – first called Hero Comics and later Hero Graphics. Over the next six years Hero Comics published about 100 comic books across several series – the most prolific of which were Champions, which centered on Hero Games' Guardians, and Flare, among the most popular of the Guardians. As Hero Games became increasingly uncomfortable with later changes in tone (including becoming more centered on depicting attractive pinups), some of the characters' owners pulled Mallonee's licensing rights, although Gleen Thain and Stacy Lawrence allowed their characters – Icestar and Flare – to continue under Mallonee's authorship. To avoid confusion Hero Games removed creator-owned characters that were still being used by Mallonee from new editions of their products. Meanwhile, Mallonee changed the names of other characters in his universe, due to these licensing issues, thus Bruce Harlick's Marksman became Huntsman and his Foxbat became The Flying Fox. Over the years, Mallonee has also developed many original characters as well, slowly pushing his comics further from Hero Games' Champions universe.

Trademark dispute
Marvel Comics published a Champions comic book series from 1975 to 1978. Since 1987, Heroic Publishing has used the name "The Champions" for a role-playing game series which has been adapted into comic books.  The United States Patent and Trademark Office has ruled that Marvel abandoned its trademark of the name and can no longer use "The Champions" as the name of a comic book series.

Bibliography

Comics Interview
 Southern Knights #35-36 (1992)

Eclipse Comics
 Champions #1-6 (1986-1987)

Heroic Publishing
 The Adventures of Chrissie Claus #2 (1994)
 The Black Enchantress #1-3 (2005)
 Champions #1-12 (1987-1988)
 Champions vol. 2 #1 (1992)
 Champions vol. 4 #3-4 (2006)
 Champions Annual #1 (1988)
 Champions Classics #13-14 (1993-1994)
 Champions / Flare Adventures #2, 8-12 (1992-1993)
 Eternity Smith #1-9 (1987-1988)
 Flare #1-3 (1988-1989)
 Flare vol. 2 #1-16 (1990-1994)
 Flare vol. 3 #2, 27-29 (2004-2005)
 Flare Adventures #19 (2007)
 Flare First Edition #4-5, 7-11 (1993)
 Icicle #1-5 (1992-1993)

 Independent Publisher's Group Spotlight #0 (1993)
 Lady Arcane #1-4 (1992-1993)
 League of Champions #1-3, 5-7, 9-11 (1990-1993)
 Liberty Comics #0, 1 (2007)
 Liberty Girl #0, 1-3 (2006-2007)
 The Marksman #1-5, Annual #1 (1988)
 Murcielaga She-Bat #2 (1993) 
 Rose #1-5 (1992-1993)
 Roy Thomas' Anthem #1, 4 (2006-2007)
 The Tigress #1, 3-6 (1992-1993)
 Witchgirls Inc. #1-5 (2005-2007)

Marvel Comics
 Iron Man #209 (1986)
 Marvel Fanfare #42 (Captain Marvel) (1989)
 Marvel Super-Heroes vol. 2 #2 (Tigra) (1990)
 Official Handbook of the Marvel Universe Deluxe Edition #6-15 (1986-1987)
 Solo Avengers #5 (Scarlet Witch) (1988)

Renegade Press
 Eternity Smith #1-5 (1986-1987)

References

External links
 
 Dennis Mallonee at the Unofficial Handbook of Marvel Comics Creators
 

1955 births
American comics writers
Comic book publishers (people)
Living people